August Lee Pfluger II (born December 28, 1978) is an American politician and retired military officer from the state of Texas. Pfluger succeeded fellow Republican Mike Conaway in 2021.

Early life and education
Pfluger's four-times-great-grandfather, Henry Pfluger Sr., founded Pflugerville, Texas. His maternal grandfather, a member of the United States Army Air Corps in World War II, inspired Pfluger to become a pilot.

Born in Harris County in 1977, Pfluger attended Central High School in San Angelo, Texas, where he played quarterback for the school's football team. He is an Eagle Scout. He earned a Bachelor of Science degree in political science from the United States Air Force Academy. Pfluger then earned a Master of Science degree in aeronautical science from Embry–Riddle Aeronautical University, a Master of Science in military and operations science from Air University, and a Master of Science in international business and policy from Georgetown University.

Military service 
Pfluger earned his commission to the United States Air Force in 2000. He served in active duty for 20 years, flying the F-15C Eagle and F-22A Raptor aircraft, reaching the rank of colonel. Pfluger later served on the United States National Security Council (NSC) during Donald Trump's presidency. He remained in the Air Force Reserve after leaving active duty. He also appeared briefly in the Fighter Pilot: Operation Red Flag IMAX film in 2004.

U.S. House of Representatives

Elections

2020 

Representative Mike Conaway, who had represented the district since its creation in 2005, was retiring after eight terms. Pfluger cleared 50% of the vote in a crowded 10-way Republican Party primary, He faced Democratic nominee Jon Mark Hogg and Libertarian Wacey Alpha Cody in the November general election.

Pfluger defeated Hogg in the general election; the 11th is so heavily Republican that only one Democrat has managed even 20% of the vote in its history.

Tenure 
Pfluger took office on January 3, 2021. On January 6, the day of the storming of the United States Capitol, he and 147 of his fellow congressional Republicans voted to block certification of President-elect Joe Biden's 2020 victory, as part of the Trump-led effort to overturn the 2020 United States presidential election. Specifically, he voted against certifying Arizona's and Pennsylvania's electoral votes.

Committee assignments 
 Committee on Homeland Security
 Committee on Foreign Affairs

Caucus membership 
 Republican Study Committee

Personal life
Pfluger and his wife, Camille, have three daughters. They live in San Angelo, Texas. His brother, Karl, is the president of an oil and energy company in Midland, Texas, and an investor in Truth Social.

References

External links

Representative August Pfluger official U.S. House website
August Pfluger for Congress

|-

1978 births
Living people
Air University (United States Air Force) alumni
Embry–Riddle Aeronautical University alumni
Georgetown University alumni
Military personnel from Texas
People from San Angelo, Texas
Place of birth missing (living people)
Players of American football from Texas
Republican Party members of the United States House of Representatives from Texas
United States Air Force Academy alumni
United States Air Force officers
United States National Security Council staffers